The Mattawa Ropeway Conveyor is a disused ropeway conveyor that crosses the Columbia River.  It links Mattawa, Washington to the previous Department of Energy lands west of the Hanford Site.  The main mechanism is on the north (Mattawa) side of the river.

Transportation buildings and structures in Benton County, Washington
Transportation buildings and structures in Grant County, Washington
Mining in Washington (state)
Transportation buildings and structures in Washington (state)
Aerial tramways in the United States
Crossings of the Columbia River